The Quinnipiac Bobcats men's ice hockey team is a National Collegiate Athletic Association (NCAA) Division I college ice hockey program that represents Quinnipiac University. The Bobcats are a member of ECAC Hockey. They play at the M&T Bank Arena in Hamden, Connecticut.

History
Quinnipiac College began sponsoring men's ice hockey as a varsity sport for the 1975–76 season. The program began as an independent team before joining ECAC 3 the following year. The program remained with the third-tier conference for over 20 years despite being a Division II school for much of that time. The Braves left ECAC 3 in 1997 and spent a year as a D-II independent before moving up to Division I as part of the university's transition to the top level. Quinnipiac was a founding member of the Metro Atlantic Athletic Conference ice hockey division, joining the conference as an affiliate member. The Braves won the MAAC Regular Season Championship in their first season in the league. The trend continued as Quinnipiac won the title the follow two seasons. In 2002 The Braves won the team's first playoff series, winning the MAAC Playoff Championship with a 6–4 win over Mercyhurst. With the win, Quinnipiac received an automatic bid to the 2002 NCAA Division I Men's Ice Hockey Tournament, the first NCAA postseason appearance in program history. Quinnipiac faced off against Cornell in the first round of the East Regional, held in Worcester, Massachusetts. Quinnipiac's run into the NCAA Tournament ended early in a 1–6 loss to the Big Red. The game was the first NCAA Tournament appearance for the Braves. Quinnipiac finished the 2001–02 season 20–13–5, marking the team's fourth consecutive season with at least 20 wins.

In 2003 the MAAC Hockey league split off from the main athletic conference to form Atlantic Hockey. After two years in Atlantic Hockey Quinnipiac left to join the ECAC, replacing Vermont who left the league for Hockey East and changed their name to the Bobcats. QU was chosen over a number of applicants in large part to the university's commitment to build a new multipurpose sports arena to replace the civic-owned Northford Ice Pavilion. The Bobcats moved into the new 3,386-seat TD Bank Sports Center (then known as TD Banknorth Sports Center) in 2007.

The 2012–13 season has brought Quinnipiac to national prominence. The program reached a new high becoming the number one team in the country on February 11, 2013 in both the USCHO.com poll and USA Today College Hockey poll. Quinnipiac retained the ranking the following week despite losing their first game as the top ranked team to St. Lawrence University as the 2nd and 3rd ranked teams also fell the same weekend. The Bobcats also won their first ever Cleary Cup presented to the ECAC regular season champion. On March 24, 2013, the Bobcats received the number one overall seed in the 2013 NCAA Division I Men's Ice Hockey Tournament. The Bobcats won the East Region with wins over Canisius (4-3) and Union (5-1) to advance to the school's first ever Frozen Four in Pittsburgh, Pa. In the national semifinals, Quinnipiac defeated St. Cloud State (4-1) to advance to the national championship game against archrival Yale. The Bobcats fell 4–0 to Yale to end the 2012-13 as the national runner-up.

In the 2013–14 season the Bobcats once again reached the NCAA tournament yet were defeated in the first round by Providence College 4–0. The team finished the season with a 24-10-6 record.

Quinnipiac once again had a successful 2014–15 season when they won their second ECAC regular season title in 3 years but lost in the first round of the NCAA tournament to North Dakota 4–1. The team finished the season with a 23-12-4 record.

The 2015–16 season saw Qunnipiac set a school record for wins with 32 along with winning their 3rd ECAC regular season title in 4 years and winning the ECAC tournament championship for the first time. Quinnipiac blew through the East Regional with wins over RIT 4-0 and UMass Lowell 4–1 to capture the regional championship and advance to the Frozen Four in the Tampa for the 2nd time in 4 seasons. In the national semifinals the Bobcats withheld a late charge by Boston College to win 3-2 and advance to the second national championship game in program history. Once again Quinnipiac was denied a national championship this time at the hands of North Dakota in a 5–1 defeat. The team finished the season with a record of 32-4-7.

Rivals
Since moving to the ECAC, Quinnipiac's biggest rival has been the Yale Bulldogs. The rivalry is dubbed the War on Whitney Avenue as the two campuses are separated by a mere 8 miles on Whitney Avenue in Hamden, Connecticut, to New Haven, Connecticut. The rivalry has reached its highest point in 2013 as both the Bobcats and the Bulldogs rank in the top 10 nationally and are 1 and 2 in the ECAC standings. Quinnipiac holds a 9-5-2 all-time record against the Bulldogs. The winner of the final game between the two teams receives the Heroes Hat which honors those who risked their lives during the September 11, 2001 terrorist attacks.  The two teams met on April 13, 2013 for the fourth time in the 2012–13 season in Pittsburgh, Pennsylvania to play for the national championship.  Quinnipiac won the previous three meetings by a combined score of 13–3, but was upset in the national championship game, 4–0.

The Cornell Big Red have also become a rival of Quinnipiac with the teams meeting in five ECAC Hockey Playoff series since the 2007 season having won in 2007 at Lynah Rink and in 2013 and 2016 in Hamden with the latter two coming with Quinnipiac as the ECAC number one seed and seasons in which Quinnipiac reached the Frozen Four. Cornell won series in 2011 and 2018 both at Lynah Rink. Quinnipiac is 3–2 in those series against Cornell with three of the series going the maximum three games. Things on the ice have been heated at times with a lot of physical play and both Rand Pecknold and Cornell head coach Mike Schafer jawing at each other as well.

Records vs. current ECAC Hockey teams
As of the completion of 2018–19 season

Season-by-season results

Source:

All-time coaching records
As of completion of 2021–22 season

Statistical leaders
Source:

Career points leaders

Career goaltending leaders

GP = Games played; Min = Minutes played; W = Wins; L = Losses; T = Ties; GA = Goals against; SO = Shutouts; SV% = Save percentage; GAA = Goals against average

Minimum 30 games

Statistics current through the start of the 2022–23 season.

Roster
As of August 27, 2022.

Awards and honors

NCAA

Individual awards

Spencer Penrose Award
Rand Pecknold: 2016

Tim Taylor Award
Sam Anas: 2014

NCAA Scoring Champion
Bryan Leitch: 2009

All-Americans
AHCA First Team All-Americans

2006–07: Reid Cashman, D
2012–13: Eric Hartzell, G
2015–16: Sam Anas, F
2020–21: Odeen Tufto, F
2021–22: Zach Metsa, D

AHCA Second Team All-Americans

2005–06: Reid Cashman, D
2014–15: Sam Anas, F
2018–19: Andrew Shortridge, G
2021–22: Yaniv Perets, G

MAAC

Individual awards

Offensive Player of the Year
Shawn Mansoff: 2000

Defensive Player of the Year
Dan Ennis: 1999
Wade Winkler: 2003

Defensive Rookie of the Year
Dan Ennis: 1999
Jamie Holden: 2002

Tournament Most Valuable Player
Matt Craig: 2002

All-Conference Teams
First Team All-MAAC

1998–99: J. C. Wells, G; Dan Ennis, D; Kris Cumming, D; Chad Poliquin, F
1999–00: Anthony DiPalma, D; Shawn Mansoff, F; Chris Cerrella, F
2000–01: Chris Cerrella, F
2002–03: Wade Winkler, D; Matt Craig, F

Second Team All-MAAC

1998–99: Neil Breen, F
2001–02: Brian Herbert, F
2002–03: Brian Herbert, F

MAAC All-Rookie Team

1998–99: Dan Ennis, D; Neil Breen, F
1999–00: Matt Erhart, D; Brian Herbert, F
2000–01: Justin Eddy, G
2001–02: Jamie Holden, G
2002–03: Conrad Martin, D; Scott Reynolds, F

Atlantic Hockey

Individual awards

Player of the Year
Reid Cashman: 2005

Regular Season Goaltending Award
Jamie Holden: 2004

Regular Season Scoring Trophy
Reid Cashman: 2005

Coach of the Year
Rand Pecknold: 2005

All-Conference Teams
First Team All-Atlantic Hockey

2003–04: Jamie Holden, G
2004–05: Reid Cashman, D

Second Team All-Atlantic Hockey

2003–04: Reid Cashman, D
2004–05: Jamie Holden, G; Matt Craig, F

Atlantic Hockey All-Rookie Team

2003–04: Reid Cashman, D
2004–05: Matt Sorteberg, D; Ben Nelson, F

ECAC Hockey

Individual awards

ECAC Hockey Player of the Year
 Eric Hartzell: 2013
 Odeen Tufto: 2021

ECAC Hockey Rookie of the Year
 Bryan Leitch: 2006
 Brandon Wong: 2008
 Sam Anas: 2014
 Sam Lipkin: 2023

Ken Dryden Award
 Eric Hartzell: 2013
 Andrew Shortridge: 2019
 Keith Petruzelli: 2021
 Yaniv Perets: 2022, 2023

ECAC Hockey Student-Athlete of the Year
 Derek Smith: 2017
 Bo Pieper: 2018

ECAC Hockey Best Defensive Defenseman
 Zach Davies: 2013

ECAC Hockey Best Defensive Forward
 Skyler Brind’Amour: 2023

Tim Taylor Award
 Rand Pecknold: 2013, 2016, 2021, 2023

ECAC Hockey Most Outstanding Player in Tournament
 Connor Clifton: 2016

All-Conference
First Team All-ECAC Hockey

 2005–06: Reid Cashman, D
 2006–07: Reid Cashman, D
 2012–13: Eric Hartzell, G
 2014–15: Matthew Peca, F
 2015–16: Sam Anas, F
 2018–19: Andrew Shortridge, G; Chase Priskie, D
 2020–21: Keith Petruzelli, G; Zach Metsa, D; Odeen Tufto, F
 2021–22: Yaniv Perets, G; Zach Metsa, D
 2022–23: Yaniv Perets, G; Collin Graf, F

Second Team All-ECAC Hockey

 2008–09: Bryan Leitch, F
 2013–14: Kellen Jones, F; Sam Anas, F
 2014–15: Sam Anas, F
 2015–16: Devon Toews, D; Tim Clifton, F; Travis St. Denis, F
 2017–18: Chase Priskie, D
 2018–19: Odeen Tufto, F
 2019–20: Odeen Tufto, F
 2022–23: Zach Metsa, D; Ethan de Jong, F

Third Team All-ECAC Hockey

 2006–07: Brandon Wong, F
 2011–12: Connor Jones, F
 2012–13: Zach Davies, D; Jeremy Langlois, F
 2014–15: Michael Garteig, G; Danny Federico, D
 2015–16: Michael Garteig, G
 2016–17: Chase Priskie, D
 2017–18: Odeen Tufto, F
 2019–20: Peter DiLiberatore, D
 2021–22: Wyatt Bongiovanni, F
 2022–23: Skyler Brind'Amour, F

ECAC Hockey All-Rookie Team

 2005–06: Bryan Leitch, F
 2006–07: Brandon Wong, F
 2011–12: Matthew Peca, F
 2013–14: Sam Anas, F
 2014–15: Landon Smith, F
 2015–16: Chase Priskie, D
 2017–18: Odeen Tufto, F
 2018–19: Peter DiLiberatore, D; Wyatt Bongiovanni, F
 2020–21: Ty Smilanic, F
 2022–23: Sam Lipkin, F

Quinnipiac Bobcats Hall of Fame
The following is a list of people associated with the Quinnipiac men's ice hockey program who were elected into the Quinnipiac Bobcats Hall of Fame (induction date in parenthesis).

Michael Barrett (1990)
Richard Buckholz (2010)
Chris Cerrella (2010)
Russell Certo (1998)
Richard Ciardiello (2003)
Jim Hanscom (1994)
Todd Johnson (2000)
Ed Muzyka (2009)
Rand Pecknold (2012)
Bob Serenson (1993)
2001-02 Team (2012)
Bill Verneris (1986)

Bobcats in the NHL
As of July 1, 2022

Source:

See also
Quinnipiac Bobcats women's ice hockey

References

External links
Bobcats men's ice hockey

 
Ice hockey teams in Connecticut